Raymond Rodgers may refer to:

 Raymond P. Rodgers (1849–1925), American naval officer
 Raymond Spencer Rodgers (1935–2007), British-born American educator and futurist

See also

Raymond Rogers (disambiguation)